The Past Presents the Future may refer to:
 "The Past Presents the Future" (Ugly Betty), an episode of the American comedy-drama series Ugly Betty
 The Past Presents the Future (album), a 2005  album by Her Space Holiday